The 2018–19 Continental Cup was the 22nd edition of the IIHF Continental Cup, Europe's second-tier ice hockey club competition organised by International Ice Hockey Federation. The season started on 28 September 2018 and the final tournament was played from 11 to 13 January 2019.

Qualified teams

First round

Group A
The Group A tournament was played in Sofia, Bulgaria, from 28 to 30 September 2018.

All times are local (UTC+3).

Second round

Group B
The Group B tournament was played in Ritten, Italy, from 19 to 21 October 2018.

All times are local (UTC+2).

Group C
The Group C tournament was played in Riga, Latvia, from 19 to 21 October 2018.

All times are local (UTC+3).

Third round

Group D
The Group D tournament was played in Lyon, France, from 16 to 18 November 2018.

All times are local (UTC+1).

Group E
The Group E tournament was played in Belfast, United Kingdom, from 15 to 17 November 2018.

All times are local (UTC±0).

Final round
Continental Cup Final tournament was played in Belfast, United Kingdom, from 11 to 13 January 2019.

All times are local (UTC±0).

See also
 2018–19 Champions Hockey League

References

External links
 Official IIHF tournament page

IIHF Continental Cup
2018–19 in European ice hockey